Roberto Eugenio Bueno Campos (born 21 January 1946) is a Mexican politician from the National Action Party. From 2000 to 2003 he served as Deputy of the LVIII Legislature of the Mexican Congress representing Veracruz.

See also 
 Veracruz state election, 1994

References

1946 births
Living people
Politicians from Veracruz
National Action Party (Mexico) politicians
21st-century Mexican politicians
Deputies of the LVIII Legislature of Mexico
Members of the Chamber of Deputies (Mexico) for Veracruz